National Route 140 is a national highway of Japan connecting Kumagaya, Saitama and Fujikawa, Yamanashi in Japan, with a total length of .

See also

References

140
Roads in Saitama Prefecture
Roads in Yamanashi Prefecture